Saint-Barthélemy-de-Vals is a commune in the Drôme department in southeastern France.

Geography
The Galaure forms most of the commune's northern border.

Population

See also
Communes of the Drôme department

References

Communes of Drôme